The position of Savilian Professor of Astronomy was established at the University of Oxford in 1619.  It was founded (at the same time as the Savilian Professorship of Geometry) by Sir Henry Savile, a mathematician and classical scholar who was Warden of Merton College, Oxford, and Provost of Eton College. He appointed John Bainbridge as the first professor, who took up his duties in 1620 or 1621.

There have been 21 astronomy professors in all; Steven Balbus, the professor , was appointed in 2012. Past professors include Christopher Wren (1661–73), architect of St Paul's Cathedral in London and the Sheldonian Theatre in Oxford; he held the professorship at the time of his commission to rebuild the cathedral after it was destroyed by the Great Fire of London in 1666.  Three professors have been awarded the Gold Medal of the Royal Astronomical Society: Charles Pritchard (1870–93), Harry Plaskett (1932–60) and Joseph Silk (1999–2012). The two Savilian chairs have been linked with professorial fellowships at New College, Oxford, since the late 19th century. In the past, some of the professors were provided with an official residence, either near New College or at the Radcliffe Observatory, although this practice ended in the 19th century. The astronomy professor is a member of the Sub-Department of Astrophysics at Oxford.

Foundation and duties
Sir Henry Savile, the Warden of Merton College, Oxford, and Provost of Eton College, was deeply saddened by what the 20th-century mathematician Ida Busbridge has described as "the wretched state of mathematical studies in England", and so founded professorships in geometry and astronomy at the University of Oxford in 1619; both chairs were named after him. He also donated his books to the university's Bodleian Library. He required the professors to be men of good character, at least 26 years old, and to have "imbibed the purer philosophy from the springs of Aristotle and Plato" before acquiring a thorough knowledge of science. The professors could come from any Christian country, but he specified that a professor from England should have a Master of Arts degree as a minimum. He wanted students to be educated in the works of the leading scientists of the ancient world; in addition, the astronomy professor should cover Copernicus and the work of Arab astronomers. Tuition in trigonometry was to be shared by the two professors.  As many students would have had little mathematical knowledge, the professors were also permitted to provide instruction in basic mathematics in English (as opposed to Latin, the language used in education at Oxford at the time). He also required the astronomy professor "to take astronomical observations as well by night as by day (making choice of proper instruments prepared for the purpose, and at fitting times and seasons)", and to place in the library records of his discoveries.  Savile prohibited the professors from practicing astrology or preparing horoscopes, and stated that accepting any position as a priest or as an officer of the university or of a college would cause forfeiture of the professorship. Each professor was required to lecture in public for 45 minutes twice weekly during the university terms and would be fined 10 shillings for every day missed (except in cases of "grievous bodily ailment", although this excuse was only permitted for three weeks before the professor was required to provide a substitute lecturer). Students who were required to attend, but who failed to do without good cause, were to be fined sixpence. Savile provided that the rents from specified properties in Kent and Essex were to be divided equally between the professors, giving each £160 annually.

Appointment
Savile selected John Bainbridge to be the first astronomy professor; Bainbridge had impressed him with a description of a comet seen in 1618. In the documents establishing the professorship (sealed by Savile and the university in August 1619), Savile reserved to himself the right to appoint the professors during his lifetime, although he died in 1622 before the position fell vacant.  He provided that after his death, vacancies should be filled by a majority of a group of "most distinguished persons": the Archbishop of Canterbury, the Lord Chancellor, the Chancellor of the university, the Bishop of London, the Secretary of State, the Chief Justice of the Common Pleas, the Chief Justice of the King's Bench, the Chief Baron of the Exchequer and the Dean of the Court of Arches. The Vice-Chancellor of the university was to inform the electors of any vacancy, and could be summoned to advise them.  The appointment could either be made straight away, or delayed for some months to see whether "any eminent mathematician can be allured" from abroad.

As part of reforms of the university in the 19th century, the University of Oxford commissioners laid down new statutes for the chair in 1881, replacing Savile's original instructions and requirements. The 1881 statute provided that the professor was to "lecture and give instruction in theoretical and practical Astronomy", and was to be a Fellow of New College. The electors for the professorship were to be the Warden of New College (or a person nominated by the college in his place), the Chancellor of the university, the President of the Royal Society, the Astronomer Royal, the Radcliffe Observer, a person nominated by the university council and one other nominated by New College. Changes to the university's internal legislation in the 20th and early 21st centuries abolished specific statutes for the duties of, and rules for appointment to, individual chairs such as the Savilian professorships. The University Council is now empowered to make appropriate arrangements for appointments and conditions of service, with the college to which any professorship is allocated (New College in the case of the Savilian chairs) to have two representatives on the board of electors. The professorship is one of two permanent chairs attached to Oxford's Sub-Department of Astrophysics.

Professors' houses
Two official residences have been provided for the astronomy professor.  The first was in New College Lane, in central Oxford.  John Wallis (geometry professor 1649–1703) rented a house there from New College from 1672 until his death in 1703; at some point, it was divided into two houses.  Towards the end of his life, David Gregory (astronomy professor 1691–1708) lived in the eastern part of the premises.  Wallis's son gave the unexpired portion of the lease to the university in 1704 in honour of his father's long tenure of the geometry chair, to provide official residences for the two Savilian professors. New College renewed the lease at a low rent from 1716 and thereafter at intervals until the last renewal in 1814. Records of who lived in each house are not available throughout the period, but surviving documentation shows that the professors often sub-let the houses and that for about 20 years in the early 18th century the premises were being used as a lodging house.

The second official residence was built during the time of Thomas Hornsby (astronomy professor 1763–1810), who proposed that an observatory should be built at a site to the north of the city centre. In 1772, construction began of the Radcliffe Observatory and of an adjoining house for the astronomy professor, to which Hornsby moved. Thereafter the university sub-let his former residence.  Both of his successors, Abraham Robertson (1810–27) and Stephen Rigaud (1827–39), were the geometry professor at their appointment to the astronomy chair, and in turn they moved from New College Lane to the Radcliffe Observatory. The university then sub-let the astronomy professor's house. The link between the professorship and the observatory was broken in 1839 with the appointment of George Johnson; he had little practical astronomical experience and the officers in charge of the observatory appointed Manuel Johnson as Radcliffe Observer instead. In the early 19th century, New College decided that it wished to use the properties for itself and the lease expired without renewal in 1854. Charles Pritchard (1870–93) had a new observatory built in the University Parks, but his attempts to persuade the university to add a residence for the Savilian professor were unsuccessful.

List of professors

See also
List of professorships at the University of Oxford

Notes

References

1619 establishments in England
Astronomy, Savilian
Astronomy, Savilian
History of astronomy
Lists of scientists by membership
Lists of people associated with the University of Oxford